Petr Drozda (born 29 March 1952) is a Czech wrestler. He competed in the men's freestyle 100 kg at the 1976 Summer Olympics.

References

External links
 

1952 births
Living people
People from Kraslice
Czech male sport wrestlers
Olympic wrestlers of Czechoslovakia
Wrestlers at the 1976 Summer Olympics
Sportspeople from the Karlovy Vary Region